Kathrin Henneberger (born 1 April 1987) is a German politician. Henneberger became a member of the Bundestag in the 2021 German federal election. She is affiliated with the Alliance 90/The Greens party.

She was spokeswoman of the Green Youth organisation (Grüne Jugend) from 2008 to 2009.

References

External links 
 

Living people
1987 births
Politicians from Cologne
21st-century German politicians
21st-century German women politicians
Members of the Bundestag for Alliance 90/The Greens
Members of the Bundestag 2021–2025
Female members of the Bundestag